Pavitrotsavam  is an annual ritual in the Tirumala Venkateswara Temple, Andhra Pradesh. Pavitrotsava is derived from the combination of two words Pavitra (holy) and utsava (festival). This utsava is penitential as well as propitiatory and its main objective is to get rid of the evil that might have been caused due to omissions and commissions in the performance of various rituals throughout the year. The festival is also known as Dosha Nivaarana (error correction),Sarva Yajna Phalapradha (The One ritual that equals the holiness of rites all year long),Sarva Doshopasamana (Removal of all errors), Sarva Tushtikara, Sarvakaamapradha, Sarvalokasantida.

Reference to holy scripts
The Jayakhya Samhita explains that pavitra protects one from evil. The puranas prescribe Pavitra Aaropana (adorning the deity with pavitra - sanctified garlands of thread), as an integral part of the rituals during the worship of Lord Vishnu. The Agni Purana specifies that the first day of a lunar fortnight either in the beginning of the month of Aashada or the end of the Krithika should be chosen for performing pavitrotsava. The Garuda Purana says that this rite should be done on the 12th day of the dark or bright fortnight.

Rituals

In Tirumala, the Pavitrotsavam ritual is conducted on  Sravana shuddha dashami day.

`Ankurarpanam' or the sowing of nine type of holy seeds in earthen containers is undertaken on the day preceding the festival. This ritual signifies the beginning of festival in the temple. This is followed by recital of vedas in a ritual called Mritsangrahana. The Ankurarpana and Mritsangrahana rituals are identical to those performed during Brahmotsava. Veda recitation is started after the Mritsangrahana ritual and this recitation of the Vedas concludes on the third day. Through the chanting of the vedas, Aavahana (Invoking) is done for Lord Vishnu in the Pradhana Kumbha (first of the holy container). There are 16 other Kumbhas surrounding this Pradhana Kumbha and it is believed that the various mantras which are recited infuse voice vibrations that have great religious and spiritual force. The Pradhana khumba is taken to the main deity on the concluding day and the augmented spiritual power is believed to be transmitted to the Moola Vigraha (Kumbha Aavaahanam). The rituals on the three days include Thirumanjanam and Homam (prayer to sacrificial fire) to the main deity as well as primary idols of Lord Venkateswara.

Pavitras, the garlands made from special thread are taken in a procession and used to decorate Lord Malayappa swami and his consorts on the second day. In the evening of the second day, the idols are taken on a procession around the four mada streets.

During the three-day festival, Arjitha Sevas like Kalyanotsavam, Arjitha Brahmotsavam, Arjitha Vasanothsavam, Sahasara Deepalankarana Seva, Dolotsavam are cancelled while the morning rituals are held.

History of festival
The origin of Pavitrotsavam in Tirumala dates back to 1463 A.D. The stone inscription found on the northern wall of the Vagapadi verandah in the first Prakaara of the Tirumala temple gives a very detailed account. The festival was instituted by Saluva Malliah deva Raja during the time of Saluva Narasimha. The inscription refers even to the items of expenditure to be incurred in connection with the celebration of Pavitra Tirunal.

The festival is believed to have been conducted until 1562 A.D. after which the ritual was stopped. The reason for discontinuing such an important festival is not recorded and remains unknown. TTD decided to revive the ritual that is followed in all Vishnu temples and the festival has been on the annual calendar from 1962 onwards.

Devotee Participation
Pavitrotsavam is an Arjita Seva - participation by payment to the Lord. TTD sells tickets to this service on the second and third days. Each ticket allows two persons and the primary ticket holder is given 10 dosas and Pongal on the second day and 10 dosas and Pongal, 6 vadas and vastram (one silk angavastram and one cotton blouse) on the third day.

References

Tirumala Venkateswara Temple
Tirumala festivals